, or Taisetsuzan is located in the mountainous center of the northern Japanese island of Hokkaidō. At , Daisetsuzan is the largest national park in Japan, and is approximately the size of Kanagawa Prefecture. Daisetsuzan, meaning "great snowy mountains", an apt description of these peaks. The park offers some of the most rugged scenery in Japan. Asahidake, located in the north of the park, is the highest peak in Hokkaidō. Daisetsuzan National Park spans two subprefectures of Hokkaidō, Kamikawa and Tokachi. Daisetsuzan National Park was established in 1934.

Mountain groups

Daisetsuzan National Park consists of three volcanic mountain groups. The groups consist of stratovolcanoes piled on top of each other. As one vent becomes active, it builds a peak then stops until a new vent appears. These groups are:

Daisetsuzan Volcanic Group — lies in the northern part of the park and includes Hokkaidō's tallest mountain, Mount Asahi.
Tokachi Volcanic Group — lies in the southwest of the park north of the Yubari and Hidaka Mountains. It includes Mount Tokachi
Shikaribetsu Volcanic Group — lies in the eastern part of the park and includes Mount Ishikari. The Ishikari River, which emerges from Mount Ishikari, is the third longest in Japan and the longest in Hokkaidō.

These volcanic groups lie around a central highlands dominated by Mount Tomuraushi. The park is also known for its alpine meadows and remote backcountry.

Nature

Daisetsuzan National Park is famous for its wildlife, and the park is home to several rare species. The park is notably home to a population of brown bears. The pika, a small mammal, with short limbs, rounded ears, and no external tail, is also found in the park. The forests of Daisetsuzan National Park are dominated by the Picea jezoensis, the Jezo spruce, and the Abies sachalinensis, the Sakhalin fir. Of the 450 species of alpine plants found in Hokkaidō, half are found in Daisetsuzan National Park.

Onsen

Daisetsuzan National Park also includes the onsen hot spring resorts of Asahidake Onsen, Fukiage Onsen, Sōunkyō Onsen and Tenninkyo Onsen.

See also
List of national parks of Japan
List of Special Places of Scenic Beauty, Special Historic Sites and Special Natural Monuments

References

External links 

 Official Website of Daisetsuzan National Park
 
 Daisetsuzan National Park at Biodiversity Center of Japan, Ministry of the Environment
 Gretel Ehrlich: Daisetsuzan, National Geographic Magazine August 2008 link

National parks of Japan
Natural monuments of Japan
Parks and gardens in Hokkaido
Protected areas established in 1934